Mirror Man can refer to:

 Mirror Man (Captain Beefheart album)
 Mirror Man (David Thomas album)
 "Mirror Man" (Ella Henderson song)
 "Mirror Man" (The Human League song)
 "Mirror Man", a song by Prism from Armageddon
 Mirror Man (character), a foe of Batman in DC Comics
 Mirror Man, someone with mirrored-self misidentification, i.e. unable to recognize himself in a mirror

See also
 Mirrorman, Japanese TV series aired on Fuji TV in 1971-72
 Man in the Mirror (disambiguation)